Tigert Hall, built in the late 1940s and early 1950s, is a historic administrative building located on the eastern edge of the University of Florida campus in Gainesville, Florida.  It was designed by architect Jefferson Hamilton in a modified Collegiate Gothic style to function as the university's main administration building.  In 1960, it was renamed for John J. Tigert, the university's third president, who served from 1928 to 1947.  Tigert Hall faces S.W. Thirteenth Street (U.S. 441), one of the major public roads adjoining the university's campus.

Tigert Hall became a contributing property in the University of Florida Campus Historic District in 2008; the historic district had been previously added to the National Register of Historic Places on April 20, 1989.

See also 

 History of the University of Florida
 List of University of Florida buildings
 List of University of Florida presidents
 University of Florida Campus Historic District

References 

Buildings at the University of Florida
National Register of Historic Places in Gainesville, Florida
KBJ Architects buildings
Historic district contributing properties in Florida
University and college buildings on the National Register of Historic Places in Florida
University and college buildings completed in 1950
1950 establishments in Florida